Gibberifera glaciata is a species of moth of the family Tortricidae. It is found in China (Henan, Hunan, Sichuan, Guizhou, Yunnan, Tibet), Taiwan, Thailand, India, Nepal and Pakistan.

The larvae feed on Salix species.

References

Moths described in 1907
Eucosmini